This is a list of hoards in Romania which comprises the significant archaeological hoards of coins, jewellery, metal objects, scrap metal and other valuable items that have been discovered in the territory of present-day Romania.

Neolithic hoards

Bronze Age hoards

Dacian hoards

Roman hoards

Gothic hoards

Medieval hoards

Modern era hoards

Notes

References
 Florian Georgescu (coord.), Istoria orașului București, Muzeul de Istorie a Orașului București, 1965

Further reading
 Liviu Mărghitan, Zece tezaure carpatine, Editura Ion Creangă, București, 1988
 Ștefan Burda, Tezaure de aur din România, Editura Meridiane, București, 1979.

External links 

Hoards in Romania
Treasure troves
Treasure troves in Romania
Romania
Hoards